The Forest of Argonne is a long strip of mountainous and wild woodland in northeastern France, approximately  east of Paris. Following the First World War, the landscape of the forest was forever changed as trench warfare lead to parts of the forest being riddled with deep man-made trenches along with craters from explosives. The forest is bordered by the Meuse River on the west and rolling farmland and creeks to the east. The forest is largely oak, chestnut, and pine trees, and  ferns cover much of the forest floor. Common animal life consists of wild boar, red deer, roe deer, hares, rabbits, foxes, and wildcat.

History 
In 1792, Charles François Dumouriez outmaneuvered the invading forces of the Duke of Brunswick in the forest before the Battle of Valmy.

During World War I, the forest again became the site of intense military action. Bitter fighting between German and Allied units took place here in fall and winter 1914, summer 1915, and fall 1918. During the Meuse–Argonne offensive (1918), several United States Army soldiers earned the Medal of Honor there, including Colonel Nelson Miles Holderman, Major Charles White Whittlesey, Sergeant Alvin C. York, Corporal Harold W. Roberts and William Henry Johnson (a.k.a. "Black Death"), most of them part of the "Lost Battalion". The World War I Montfaucon American Monument consists of a large granite Doric column surmounted by a statue symbolic of Liberty.

Points of interest
Arboretum du Petit-Bois
Chattancourt
Lachalade Abbey
Meuse-Argonne American cemetery
Varennes-en-Argonne

See also
Argonne Forest, an affluent neighborhood in Atlanta, Georgia.
Argonnerwaldlied
Argonne Forest park, an amusement park in Dayton, Ohio built by a former U.S. soldier as a tribute to his fellow soldiers that never returned from the Argonne Forest in France during World War I
Meuse–Argonne offensive

References

External links
 
 Militarymuseum.com
 Google Earth view of Argonne Forest area
 DaytonDailyNews.com

Geography of Grand Est
Forests of France